The Prescott Fire Department is the municipal fire department for the city of Prescott, Arizona. Additionally, the PFD provides aircraft rescue and firefighting for the Prescott Municipal Airport. Founded in 1885, it is the oldest fire department in the state of Arizona.

History 
Prior to 1884, Prescott had no water system for fire protection. Wells were sunk at the four corners of the courthouse plaza and double acting hand pumps were installed. In 1954 the then four separate volunteer companies were merged into one and named Prescott Fire Department.

Granite Mountain Hotshots

The Granite Mountain Hotshots were a group within the department whose mission was to fight wildfires. Founded in 2002 as a fuels mitigation crew, it transitioned  to a handcrew (Type 2 I/A) in 2004, and ultimately to a hotshot crew in 2008. The crew had their own fire station, station 7, where equipment, including two 10-person crew carriers, was housed.  The 2017 film Only the Brave was based on the Granite Mountain Hotshots and the Yarnell Fire.

Yarnell Fire fatalities 

On June 30, 2013, 19 members of the 20-man group died fighting the Yarnell Hill Fire. Only Brendan McDonough survived. The firefighters had apparently deployed fire shelters, but not all of the bodies were found inside them. According to the National Fire Protection Association, it was the greatest loss of life for firefighters in a wildfire since 1933, the deadliest wildfire of any kind since 1991, and one of the greatest losses of firefighters in the United States next to the September 11 attacks. Vice President Joe Biden attended the memorial and stated, "All men are created equal. But then, a few became firefighters."

Stations and apparatus

References

Fire departments in Arizona
Emergency services in Yavapai County, Arizona
Prescott, Arizona